Girls' Sport Victoria (GSV) was established in 2001, and is one of the largest independent school sporting associations in Victoria, Australia, with 24 member schools from around Melbourne.

GSV provides approximately 16,500 girls, from years seven to twelve, with the opportunity to be involved in over 20 sports through weekly competitions, carnivals, tournaments and skill development programs.

Schools

Current member schools

Former member schools

Possible future member schools

History
In 1999, the principal of Melbourne Girls Grammar School, Christine Briggs, held a meeting of principals of girls' schools at the Lyceum Club. She felt the need to organise the meeting after receiving a letter of invitation from the Associated Public Schools of Victoria (APS) inviting her school to join their association.

Many APS boys' schools had introduced co-education and were finding it difficult to provide adequate inter-school sports experiences for their female students. As the oldest schools association, APS felt it was in a strong position to convince independent girls' schools to become members. Briggs was concerned that the APS saw girls' schools as the solution to their problem, and was aware that girls' schools were fragmented into so many sporting associations, that the approach might be successful for the APS, but harming girls' schools.

Briggs put the issue of girls' sport to the principals at the meeting, and it was agreed that it was time to consider the idea of a new sports organisation catering for the needs of all-female schools. It was stressed by many that the heritage of girls' sport built over more than a century by the involved schools could not be abandoned or seriously affected.

Following this meeting, a forum was led by Diana Bowman, the former principal of SCEGGS Darlinghurst in New South Wales, who had much experience with the successful and foremost girls' sporting association in her State, the Independent Girls' Schools Sporting Association (the sporting arm of the Association of Heads of Independent Girls' Schools). It was at this forum that the decision was made to create a new sports organisation to which the 24 girls' schools could belong, and that existing Associations would then cease to exist. In the same year, the name "Girls Sport Victoria" was selected for the new organisation. Further, it was acknowledged that creating "Girls Sport Victoria" would take time, and therefore a Project Officer was needed to undertake the task. Fiona Preston was the person selected, and began work immediately in order to complete preparations for the commencement of the sports program in 2001. She was supported by a Committee of Principals, a Committee of Heads of Sport, and working committees for each sport.

Preston, along with the first executive officer, Meredith Prime, and a small group of staff, created a program of sports and three major carnivals, track and field, swimming and diving, and cross country in three Divisions. Zoned groups of schools were established for weekly interschool competitions in netball, basketball, softball, tennis, indoor cricket, hockey, water polo, soccer, volleyball, and badminton. In addition, Saturday morning sport, which was especially attractive to boarding schools, offered golf, Australian rules football, taekwondo, and triathlon. Also organised were seasonal competitions in cricket and Surf League, and 'fun days' for students in Years 7 and 8.

Many challenges were met by the organisers, such as the vast geographic spread of the schools; the varying size of schools, ranging from 300 to almost 2000 students; the differences in quality and number of sports facilities within and outside schools; the difference in strength between schools and within sports; the cost to schools to meet their responsibilities; concern about potential loss of academic time through travel to venues; the determination of GSV rules and regulations; talent identification; promotion of leadership opportunities; and the availability of quality umpiring.

Previous associations
Prior to the establishment of Girls' Sport Victoria, there were seven girls' schools sporting associations catering to the sporting needs of the 24 GSV schools, and a small number of other schools. These associations were subsequently disbanded in 2001.

Associated Anglican Girls’ Grammar Schools (1920–2000)
Church Secondary Schools Sports Association, later the Associated Anglican Girls’ Grammar Schools (AAGGS), was created in 1920 and conducted the first combined girls’ schools sports day in Victoria on 30 April 1920, at Toorak Park, Armadale. The first cultural event held by the Associated Church of England Girls’ Grammar Schools was a Combined Choir Festival at the St Kilda Town Hall on Thursday 9 October 1941, in aid of Red Cross Funds with the guest of honour being Miss Una Bourne.

Girls' Schools Association (1920–2000)
The Girls' Secondary Schools Sports Association (GSSSA), later the Girls' Schools Sports Association (GSSA) was formed in 1920. In the early 1990s, it changed its name to the Girls Schools Association (GSA).

^Tintern participated in the Swimming Carnivals from at least 1949 – 1953 and the Athletics Carnivals from 1956 – 1958

Zone Sports Association (1968–2000)

Girls’ Schools Sports Association (1975–2000)
The "Girls’ Schools Sports Association", formerly the Eastern Suburbs Association and later the Eastern Sports Association (ESA), was formed in 1975. In 1984, Loreto Toorak was invited to participate as a non-voting member and in 1988, the girls at Wesley College were also invited to participate as a non-voting member. In 1993, Carey Grammar was asked to re-consider its membership of the new GSSA, as it was the only co-educational school in the ESA. Genazzano was invited to participate as a non-voting member in 1993 before becoming a full member the following year following the departure of Carey Grammar. Athletics and swimming carnivals were conducted and students competed in baseball, basketball, cricket, hockey, netball and tennis competitions throughout the year.

Public Schools Sports Association (1904–2000)
The Public Schools Association, later known as the Girls’ Private Schools Victorian Sports Association, was created in 1904 and conducted their first tennis competition soon there after.

Secondary Catholic Sports Association (established 1980)
The Secondary Catholic Sports Association (SCSA) is a sporting body that promotes and provides sporting carnivals for a group of Catholic girls schools in Melbourne, Victoria, Australia established in 1980.  Membership of the SCSA is restricted to metropolitan and country Catholic Secondary Schools, upon payment of the annual affiliation fee. Membership is open either to girls’ schools or coeducational Catholic Colleges, however events cater only for girls.

Academy of Mary Immaculate, Fitzroy
Ave Maria College, Aberfeldie
Avila College, Mount Waverley
Catholic Ladies' College, Eltham
Clonard College, Geelong
Genazzano FCJ College, Kew
Kilbreda College, Mentone
Killester College, Springvale

Loreto College, Ballarat
Marian College, Sunshine West
Mater Christi College, Belgrave
Mercy Diocesan College, Coburg
Mount St Joseph Girls' College, Altona
Our Lady of Mercy College, Heidelberg
Our Lady of Sion College, Box Hill
Our Lady of the Sacred Heart College, Bentleigh

Sacred Heart College, Geelong
Sacred Heart Girls' College, Oakleigh
Santa Maria College, Northcote
St Aloysius College, North Melbourne
St Columbas College, Essendon
St Mary's College, St Kilda
Star of the Sea College, Gardenvale

Former member schools 

Kildara College, Malvern
Kilbride College, Albert Park
Kilmaira College, Hawthorn

Loreto Mandeville Hall, Toorak
Mount Lilydale Mercy College, Lilydale
Presentation College, Windsor

Sacré Cœur, Glen Iris
Siena College, Camberwell

Southern District Sports Association (? – 2000)

NB: For a brief period, two Associations existed with the name "Girls' Schools Sports Association".

Presidents of the Association

Sports
Students from Girls Sport Victoria member schools participate in a wide range of sporting activities including:

Weekly Sports
 Australian Football 
 Badminton
 Basketball
 Cricket
 Indoor Cricket
 Hockey
 Netball
 Soccer
 Softball
 Tennis
 Volleyball
 Waterpolo

Carnivals
 Cross Country
 Diving
 Swimming
 Track and Field

Sport Skills Program
 Cycle sport
 Diving
 Fencing

Other Events
 Basketball Tournament
 Five a side Soccer Tournament 
 Golf Tournament
 Triathlon
 Year 7 Sports Expo

Representative Sport
 Cross Country
 Netball
 Soccer
 Swimming
 Volleyball
 Water Polo

Head of the Schoolgirls Regatta

See also
 List of schools in Victoria
 List of high schools in Victoria

References

External links
 Girls Sport Victoria

 
Australian school sports associations
Sports governing bodies in Victoria (Australia)
Sports organizations established in 2001
2001 establishments in Australia